The 2020 season is the 22nd season of competitive association football in Abkhazia.

National teams

Abkhazia national football team

Results and fixtures

Friendlies

Men's football

Premier League

Cup competitions

Abkhazian Cup

Quarter-finals

Leg 1

Leg 2

Semi-finals

Final

Super Cup

Final

References

2020 sport-related lists
Football in Abkhazia
2020 in European football